Ned Gerard (born 14 July 1956 in New Jersey, U.S.) is a competitive sharpshooter from the United States Virgin Islands. He represented the Virgin Islands at the 2008 Summer Olympics in the 50 m rifle prone event.

References

External links

1956 births
Living people
Shooters at the 2008 Summer Olympics
Olympic shooters of the United States Virgin Islands
United States Virgin Islands male sport shooters
Shooters at the 2003 Pan American Games
Shooters at the 2007 Pan American Games
Shooters at the 2011 Pan American Games
Shooters at the 2015 Pan American Games
Pan American Games competitors for the United States Virgin Islands